The radian, denoted by the symbol rad, is the unit of angle in the International System of Units (SI) and is the standard unit of angular measure used in many areas of mathematics. The unit was formerly an SI supplementary unit (before that category was abolished in 1995). The radian is defined in the SI as being a dimensionless unit, with 1 rad = 1. Its symbol is accordingly often omitted, especially in mathematical writing.

Definition 

One radian is defined as the angle subtended from the center of a circle which intercepts an arc equal in length to the radius of the circle. A right angle is exactly  radians.

Thus,  radians is equal to 360 degrees.

The relation  can be derived using the formula for arc length, . Since radian is the measure of an angle that is subtended by an arc of a length equal to the radius of the circle, . Multiplying both sides by 360° gives .

Unit symbol 
The International Bureau of Weights and Measures and International Organization for Standardization specify rad as the symbol for the radian. Alternative symbols that were in use in 1909 are c (the superscript letter c, for "circular measure"), the letter r, or a superscript , but these variants are infrequently used, as they may be mistaken for a degree symbol (°) or a radius (r). Hence an angle of 1.2 radians would be written today as 1.2 rad; archaic notations could include 1.2 r, 1.2, 1.2, or 1.2.

In mathematical writing, the symbol "rad" is often omitted. When quantifying an angle in the absence of any symbol, radians are assumed, and when degrees are meant, the degree sign  is used.

Dimensional analysis 
However,  is only to be used to express angles, not to express ratios of lengths in general. A similar calculation using the area of a circular sector  gives 1 radian as 1 m2/m2. The key fact is that the radian is a dimensionless unit equal to 1. In 1993 the American Association of Physics Teachers Metric Committee specified that the radian should explicitly appear in quantities only when different numerical values would be obtained when other angle measures were used, such as in the quantities of angle measure (rad), angular speed (rad/s), angular acceleration (rad/s2), and torsional stiffness (N⋅m/rad), and not in the quantities of torque (N⋅m) and angular momentum (kg⋅m2/s).

Giacomo Prando says "the current state of affairs leads inevitably to ghostly appearances and disappearances of the radian in the dimensional analysis of physical equations." When multiplying  by  the unit of radians disappears from the result. Similarly in the formula for the angular velocity of a rolling wheel, radians appear in the units of  but not on the right hand side. Anthony French calls this phenomenon "a perennial problem in the teaching of mechanics". Oberhofer says that the typical advice of ignoring radians during dimensional analysis and adding or removing radians in units according to convention and contextual knowledge is "pedagogically unsatisfying".

At least a dozen scientists between 1936 and 2022 have made proposals to treat the radian as a base unit of measure defining its own dimension of "angle". Quincey's review of proposals outlines two classes of proposal. The first option changes the unit of a radius to meters per radian, but this is incompatible with dimensional analysis for the area of a circle, . The other option is to introduce a dimensional constant. According to Quincey this approach is "logically rigorous" compared to SI, but requires "the modification of many familiar mathematical and physical equations".

In particular, Quincey identifies Torrens' proposal to introduce a constant  equal to 1 inverse radian (1 rad−1) in a fashion similar to the introduction of the constant ε0. With this change the formula for the angle subtended at the center of a circle, is modified to become , and the Taylor series for the sine of an angle  becomes:The capitalized function  is the "complete" function that takes an argument with a dimension of angle and is independent of the units expressed, while  is the traditional function on pure numbers which assumes its argument is in radians.  can be denoted  if it is clear that the complete form is meant.

SI can be considered relative to this framework as a natural unit system where the equation  is assumed to hold, or similarly, .

A dimensional constant for angle is "rather strange" and the difficulty of modifying equations to add the dimensional constant is likely to preclude widespread use. Defining radian as a base unit may be useful for software, where the disadvantage of longer equations is minimal. For example, the Boost units library defines angle units with a plane_angle dimension, and Mathematica's unit system similarly considers angles to have an angle dimension.

Conversions

Between degrees 

For example:

For example:

Radians can be converted to turns (one turn is the angle corresponding to a revolution) by dividing the number of radians by 2.

Between gradians 

 radians equals one turn, which is by definition 400 gradians (400 gons or 400g). For example,

Usage

Mathematics 

In calculus and most other branches of mathematics beyond practical geometry, angles are measured in radians. This is because radians have a mathematical naturalness that leads to a more elegant formulation of some important results.

Results in analysis involving trigonometric functions can be elegantly stated when the functions' arguments are expressed in radians. For example, the use of radians leads to the simple limit formula

which is the basis of many other identities in mathematics, including

Because of these and other properties, the trigonometric functions appear in solutions to mathematical problems that are not obviously related to the functions' geometrical meanings (for example, the solutions to the differential equation , the evaluation of the integral  and so on). In all such cases, it is found that the arguments to the functions are most naturally written in the form that corresponds, in geometrical contexts, to the radian measurement of angles.

The trigonometric functions also have simple and elegant series expansions when radians are used. For example, when x is in radians, the Taylor series for sin x becomes:

In a similar spirit, mathematically important relationships between the sine and cosine functions and the exponential function (see, for example, Euler's formula) can be elegantly stated, when the functions' arguments are in radians (and messy otherwise).

Physics 
The radian is widely used in physics when angular measurements are required. For example, angular velocity is typically expressed in the unit radian per second (rad/s). One revolution per second corresponds to 2 radians per second.

Similarly, the unit used for angular acceleration is often radian per second per second (rad/s2).

For the purpose of dimensional analysis, the units of angular velocity and angular acceleration are s−1 and s−2 respectively.

Likewise, the phase difference of two waves can also be expressed using the radian as the unit.

Prefixes and variants 
Metric prefixes for submultiples are used with radians. A milliradian (mrad) is a thousandth of a radian (0.001 rad), i.e. . There are 2 × 1000 milliradians (≈ 6283.185 mrad) in a circle. So a milliradian is just under  of the angle subtended by a full circle. This unit of angular measurement of a circle is in common use by telescopic sight manufacturers using (stadiametric) rangefinding in reticles. The divergence of laser beams is also usually measured in milliradians.

The angular mil is an approximation of the milliradian used by NATO and other military organizations in gunnery and targeting. Each angular mil represents  of a circle and is % or 1.875% smaller than the milliradian. For the small angles typically found in targeting work, the convenience of using the number 6400 in calculation outweighs the small mathematical errors it introduces. Being based on the milliradian, the NATO mil subtends roughly 1 m at a range of 1000 m (at such small angles, the curvature is negligible).

Prefixes smaller than milli- are useful in measuring extremely small angles. Microradians (μrad) and nanoradians (nrad) are used in astronomy, and can also be used to measure the beam quality of lasers with ultra-low divergence. More common is the arc second, which is  rad (around 4.8481 microradians).

History

Pre-20th century 
The idea of measuring angles by the length of the arc was in use by mathematicians quite early. For example, al-Kashi (c. 1400) used so-called diameter parts as units, where one diameter part was  radian. They also used sexagesimal subunits of the diameter part. Newton in 1672 spoke of "the angular quantity of a body's circular motion", but used it only as a relative measure to develop an astronomical algorithm.

The concept of the radian measure is normally credited to Roger Cotes, who died in 1716. By 1722, his cousin Robert Smith had collected and published Cotes' mathematical writings in a book, Harmonia mensurarum. In a chapter of editorial comments, Smith gave what is probably the first published calculation of one radian in degrees, citing a note of Cotes that has not survived. Smith described the radian in everything but name, and recognized its naturalness as a unit of angular measure.

In 1765, Leonhard Euler implicitly adopted the radian as a unit of angle. Specifically, Euler defined angular velocity as "The angular speed in rotational motion is the speed of that point, the distance of which from the axis of gyration is expressed by one." Euler was probably the first to adopt this convention, referred to as the radian convention, which gives the simple formula for angular velocity .

Prior to the term radian becoming widespread, the unit was commonly called circular measure of an angle. The term radian first appeared in print on 5 June 1873, in examination questions set by James Thomson (brother of Lord Kelvin) at Queen's College, Belfast. He had used the term as early as 1871, while in 1869, Thomas Muir, then of the University of St Andrews, vacillated between the terms rad, radial, and radian. In 1874, after a consultation with James Thomson, Muir adopted radian. The name radian was not universally adopted for some time after this. Longmans' School Trigonometry still called the radian circular measure when published in 1890.

As a SI unit 

As Paul Quincey et al. writes, "the status of angles within the International System of Units (SI) has long been a source of controversy and confusion." In 1960, the CGPM established the SI and the radian was classified as a "supplementary unit" along with the steradian. This special class was officially regarded "either as base units or as derived units", as the CGPM could not reach a decision on whether the radian was a base unit or a derived unit. Richard Nelson writes "This ambiguity [in the classification of the supplemental units] prompted a spirited discussion over their proper interpretation." In May 1980 the Consultative Committee for Units (CCU) considered a proposal for making radians an SI base unit, using a constant , but turned it down to avoid an upheaval to current practice. 

In October 1980 the CGPM decided that supplementary units were dimensionless derived units for which the CGPM allowed the freedom of using them or not using them in expressions for SI derived units, on the basis that "[no formalism] exists which is at the same time coherent and convenient and in which the quantities plane angle and solid angle might be considered as base quantities" and that "[the possibility of treating the radian and steradian as SI base units] compromises the internal coherence of the SI based on only seven base units". In 1995 the CGPM eliminated the class of supplementary units and defined the radian and the steradian as "dimensionless derived units, the names and symbols of which may, but need not, be used in expressions for other SI derived units, as is convenient". Mikhail Kalinin writing in 2019 has criticized the 1980 CGPM decision as "unfounded" and says that the 1995 CGPM decision used inconsistent arguments and introduced "numerous discrepancies, inconsistencies, and contradictions in the wordings of the SI".

At the 2013 meeting of the CCU, Peter Mohr gave a presentation on alleged inconsistencies arising from defining the radian as a dimensionless unit rather than a base unit. CCU President Ian M. Mills declared this to be a "formidable problem" and the CCU Working Group on Angles and Dimensionless Quantities in the SI was established.  but did not reach a consensus. A small number of members argued strongly that the radian should be a base unit, but the majority felt the status quo was acceptable or that the change would cause more problems than it would solve. A task group was established to "review the historical use of SI supplementary units and consider whether reintroduction would be of benefit", among other activities.

See also 
 Angular frequency
 Minute and second of arc
 Steradian, a higher-dimensional analog of the radian which measures solid angle
 Trigonometry

Notes

References

External links 

 

Natural units
SI derived units
Pi
Units of plane angle